Sir John Colville (c. 1337 – 1394), of Newton, Cambridgeshire and Walsoken, Norfolk, was an English politician.

He was a Member (MP) of the Parliament of England for Cambridgeshire in January 1377, April 1384, 1385, November 1390 and 1393.

References

1337 births
1394 deaths
John
English MPs January 1377
People from Walsoken
English MPs April 1384
English MPs 1385
English MPs November 1390
English MPs 1393